Sprinting is running over a short distance at the top-most speed of the body in a limited period of time. It is used in many sports that incorporate running, typically as a way of quickly reaching a target or goal, or avoiding or catching an opponent. Human physiology dictates that a runner's near-top speed cannot be maintained for more than 30–35 seconds due to the depletion of phosphocreatine stores in muscles, and perhaps secondarily to excessive metabolic acidosis as a result of anaerobic glycolysis.

In athletics and track and field, sprints (or dashes) are races over short distances. They are among the oldest running competitions, being recorded at the Ancient Olympic Games. Three sprints are currently held at the modern Summer Olympics and outdoor World Championships: the 100 metres, 200 metres, and 400 metres.

At the professional level, sprinters begin the race by assuming a crouching position in the starting blocks before driving forward and gradually moving into an upright position as the race progresses and momentum is gained. The set position differs depending on the start. The use of starting blocks allows the sprinter to perform an enhanced isometric preload; this generates muscular pre-tension which is channeled into the subsequent forward drive, making it more powerful. Body alignment is of key importance in producing the optimal amount of force. Ideally, the athlete should begin in a 4-point stance and drive forwards, pushing off using both legs for maximum force production. Athletes remain in the same lane on the running track throughout all sprinting events, with the sole exception of the 400 metres indoors. Races up to 100 metres are largely focused upon acceleration to an athlete's maximum speed. All sprints beyond this distance increasingly incorporate an element of endurance.

History

The first 13 editions of the Ancient Olympic Games featured only one event—the stadion race, which was a sprinting race from one end of the stadium to the other. The Diaulos (Δίαυλος, "double pipe") was a double-stadion race, introduced in the 14th Olympiad of the ancient Olympic Games (724BC).

Sprint races were part of the original Olympic Games in the 7th century B.C. as well as the first modern Olympic Games which started in the late 19th century (Athens 1896) and featured the 100 meters and 400 meters.  Athletes started both races from a crouched start (4-point stance).  In both the original Olympics and the modern Olympics, only men were allowed to participate in track and field until the 1928 games in Amsterdam, Netherlands.  The 1928 games were also the first games to use a 400-meter track, which became the standard for track and field.

The modern sprinting events have their roots in races of imperial measurements which were later altered to metric: the 100 m evolved from the 100-yard dash, the 200 m distance came from the furlong (or  mile), and the 400 m was the successor to the 440-yard dash or quarter-mile race.

Technological advances have always improved sprint performances (i.e., starting blocks, synthetic track material, and shoe technology).  In 1924, athletes used a small shovel to dig holes to start the race.   The world record in the 100-meter dash in 1924 was 10.4 seconds, while in 1948, (the first use of starting blocks) was 10.2 seconds, and was 10.1 seconds in 1956.  The constant drive for faster athletes with better technology has brought man from 10.4 seconds to 9.58 seconds in less than 100 years.

Track events were measured with the metric system except for the United Kingdom and the United States until 1965 and 1974 respectively.  The Amateur Athletic Association (AAU) decided to switch track and field in the U.S. to the metric system to finally make track and field internationally equivalent.  Before this, American athletes could only qualify for world records at international events and Olympic Games.

Biological factors for runners
Biological factors that determine a sprinter's potential include:

 Height (minor factor)
 Muscular strength
 Adrenaline use
 Anaerobic respiration capacity
 Breathing
 Footspeed
 Proportion of fast twitch muscles
 Leg length
 Pelvic width

Competitions

Common contemporary distances

60 meters 

 Normally run indoors, on a straight section of an indoor athletic track.
 Some of the fastest humans reach their maximum speed around the 60-metre mark.
 60-meters is often used as an outdoor distance by younger athletes when starting sprint racing.

Note: Indoor distances are less standardized, as many facilities run shorter or occasionally longer distances depending on available space. 60 m is the championship distance.

100 meters 

 Takes place on the straight of a standard outdoor 400 m track.
 Often, the world-record holder in this race is considered "the world's fastest man/woman."
 Primarily an outdoor race.

200 meters 

 Begins on the curve of a standard track (where the runners are staggered in their starting position, to ensure that they all run the same distance), and ends on the home straight.
 Competed both indoors and outdoors, with only slightly slower times than outdoors.

400 meters 

 Runners are staggered in their starting positions to ensure that everyone runs the same distance.
 Competed both indoors and outdoors, with only slightly slower times than outdoors.

4 × 100 metres relay 

 Runners are staggered in their starting positions to ensure that everyone runs the same distance.
 Runners use acceleration zones and exchange zones to pass a baton

4 × 400 metres relay 

 Runners are staggered in their starting positions to ensure that everyone runs the same distance.
 Runners use exchange zones to pass a baton.
 Typically, the final race at track meets.

Historical and uncommon distances

50 yards (45.72 m)
The event was a common event for most American students because it was one of the standardized test events as part of the President's Award on Physical Fitness.

50 m
The 50 metres is an uncommon event and alternative to the 60 metres. Donovan Bailey holds the men's world record with a time of 5.56 seconds and Irina Privalova holds the women's world record with a time of 5.96 seconds.

60 yards (54.864 m)

  A rarely run sprinting event that was once more commonplace. The world record time of 5.99 is held by Lee McRae and was set in 1987. The time is often used for American Football speed training.

55 m
The 55 metres is an uncommon event that resulted from the metrication of the 60 yards and is an alternative to the 60 metres.

70 Yards
An extremely rare sprinting event, that was occasionally run in the 1960s. The world record of 6.90 is held by Bob Hayes.

100 yards (91.44 m)
 The outdoor standard in the English (imperial measured) speaking world.  It was part of the Commonwealth Games up until 1966 and was the premier event in American high school sprinting until the NFHS changed to metric in 1980, now only a secondary distance to the 100 metres.
 The unofficial World Record Holder is Jamaican Asafa Powell with a time of 9.07 seconds.

150 m

 The informal distance of 150 metres (164.042 yards) can be used to work on a 100 m runner's stamina, or a 200 m runner's speed, and has been used as an exhibition distance. The distance was used in a race between the 1996 Olympic champions, the 100 m gold medalist Donovan Bailey (Canada) and the 200 m gold medalist Michael Johnson (USA). It was to decide which of the two was really the 'fastest man on earth' (see Bailey–Johnson 150-metre race).
 The informal distance was used for an exhibition race during the Manchester Great CityGames as part of the 2009 Great Manchester Run (UK). Stars included Triple Olympic Champion Usain Bolt (Jamaica) alongside Ivory Williams (USA), Simeon Williamson (UK), and other international track stars. The female race included 400 m Olympic Champion, Christine Ohuruogu of Great Britain alongside Debbie Ferguson-McKenzie (Bahamas). Bolt ran the distance in a record time of 14.35 seconds.

Stadion

The stadion, also known as the stade, was the standard short distance sprint in ancient Greece and ran the length of a stadium. However, stadiums could vary in size and there was apparently no definite standard length for them, e.g., the stadium at Delphi measures 177 m and the one at Pergamon 210 m.

300 m
 The 300 metres is another informal distance, which could be used to aid a 200 m runner's stamina, or a 400 m runner's speed. Currently, the world's best for this event is 30.81 seconds, set by Wayde van Niekerk in Ostrava, Czech Republic in 2017. The women's record is 35.30 seconds, set by Ana Guevara at altitude in Mexico City in 2003.  Junior girls in several countries run this distance instead of the 400 metres.

Diaulos
The diaulos was an event contested in the Ancient Greek Olympia that was double the length of a stadion.

4 × 200 metres relay 

 Runners are staggered in their starting positions to ensure that everyone runs the same distance.
 Runners use acceleration zones and exchange zones to pass a baton

Equipment

Shoes 
Typically, a sprinter would only need 2 types of shoes, training shoes and sprinting spikes.

Sprinting spikes are typically designed to be lightweight, with a minimal cushion on the heels and a plate on the forefoot to keep the runner on the toes of each foot.  The spike plate will typically have the maximum number of holes for metal spikes to be inserted to keep a proper grip on the track surface.  These metal removable spikes also come in varying sizes.  The spikes typically range from 4 mm to 15 mm and come in different styles.  Most facilities have specific requirements for what size and style spikes can be used.

Starting Blocks 
Starting blocks are not a necessity but are highly suggested for use in sprinting events.  Starting blocks are a piece of equipment that typically consists of foot pads attached to a central rail.  The point of using blocks is to help the athlete push themselves further down the track as quickly as possible.

Typical Block Start Set-up 

 Place heel on slightly on the starting line
 Place the blocks in the center of the track, approximately where your toe is.
 The dominant foot will be in the front block. With the paddle being set at 45 degrees
 The front block will be about 1 -2 foot lengths from the starting line.
 The non-dominant foot will be in the back block.  The paddle will be set as high as possible.
 The back block will be set about 3-3  foot lengths from the starting line.
 It is important to note that the front block and back block are only about 1-foot in length apart.
 The toes should barely touch the ground.  
 Hands will be placed about shoulder-width apart, with the thumb and pointer finger slightly behind the line.
 Arms should be in a straight position (locked or prepared to be locked at the elbows)
 The arms will remain straight (if not locked at the elbows)
 The hips will rise slightly above the shoulders (forcing the front half of the body to lean forward at about 45 degrees (slightly less)).
 A forward lean is optimal because it shifts most of the weight to the hands with a minimal bend to the back.
 The dominant leg should have about a 90-degree bend at the knee, while the non-dominant leg should be about 120 degrees
 The arm on the dominant foot side will swing forward in an “exaggerated” fashion, while the arm on the non-dominant side will swing backward in the same fashion
 The non-dominant foot will be the first step.
 The non-dominant leg should come out with a long (within comfort's range) stride, bringing the knee to a 90-degree position (separation of the foot and opposite leg's knee about 2-2  feet), approximately a 45-degree shin angle, and dorsiflexion with each stride.
 Halfway before the first step lands, the “driving” position should have a straight line through the non-dominant ankle, knee, hips, shoulders, and head.

Baton 
The baton is a required element for any relay race. The baton is passed to each athlete through different exchange zones, with different techniques.

Timing

Stopwatches 
Used typically in training sessions to measure relative times and recovery times.  Stopwatches are not always the most accurate way to measure times in a race setting,

Fully Automatic Timing / Gate Systems 
Fully Automatic Timing (FAT) and gate systems are used to accurately measure races, with results as accurate as up to 1/1000 of a second.

Governing Bodies 
As of 2021, World Athletics (WA)  is the governing body for track and field around the world. Every country that wishes to participate in WA competitions must become a member.

Rules

Rule differences with each Governing Bodies 
Each governing body sets its own rules for how competition is deemed fair.  World Athletics sets the competition rules internationally. The World Athletics rulebook is broken into 4 separate books.

The start

Starting blocks are used for all competition sprints (up to and including 400 m) and relay events (first leg only, up to 4x400 m). The starting blocks consist of two adjustable footplates attached to a rigid frame. Races commence with the firing of the starter's gun. The starting commands are "On your marks" and "Set". Once all athletes are in the set position, the starter's gun is fired, officially starting the race. For the 100 m, all competitors are lined up side by side. For the 200 m, 300 m, and 400 m, which involve curves, runners are staggered for the start.

In the rare event that there are technical issues with a start, a green card is shown to all the athletes. The green card carries no penalty. If an athlete is unhappy with track conditions after the "on your marks" command is given, the athlete must raise a hand before the "set" command and provide the Start referee with a reason. It is then up to the Start referee to decide if the reason is valid. If the Start referee deems the reason invalid, a yellow card (warning) is issued to that particular athlete. If the athlete is already on a warning, the athlete is disqualified.

False starts

According to the World Athletics (WA) rules, "An athlete, after assuming a full and final set position, shall not commence his starting motion until after receiving the report of the gun or approved starting apparatus. If, in the judgement of the Starter or Recallers, he does so any earlier, it shall be deemed a false start."

The 100 m Olympic gold and silver medallist Linford Christie of Great Britain famously had frequent false starts that were marginally below the legal reaction time of 0.1  seconds. Christie and his coach, Ron Roddan, both claimed that the false starts were due to Christie's exceptional reaction times being under legal time. His frequent false starting eventually led to his disqualification from the 1996 Summer Olympics 100 m final in Atlanta, the US, due to a second false start by Christie.  Since January 2010, under WA rules, a single false start by an athlete resulted in disqualification.

In 2012, a new development to the false start rule was added. Because certain athletes could be disqualified for twitching in the starting blocks, but some athletes could make a twitch without the starter noticing and disqualifying the athlete, it was decided that twitching in the starting block while being in the 'set' position would only carry a maximum penalty of a yellow card or a warning. To instantly be disqualified for a false start, an athlete's hands must leave the track or their feet must leave the starting blocks, while the athlete is in their final 'set' position.

Lanes

For all Olympic sprint events, runners must remain within their pre-assigned lanes, which measure 1.22 metres (4 feet) wide, from start to finish. The lanes can be numbered 1 through 8, 9, or rarely 10, starting with the inside lane. Any athlete who runs outside the assigned lane to gain an advantage is subject to disqualification. If the athlete is forced to run outside of his or her lane by another person, and no material advantage is gained, there will be no disqualification. Also, a runner who strays from his or her lane in the straightaway, or crosses the outer line of his or her lane on the bend, and gains no advantage by it, will not be disqualified as long as no other runner is obstructed.

The finish
The first athlete whose torso reaches the vertical plane of the closest edge of the finish line is the winner. To ensure that the sprinter's torso triggers the timing impulse at the finish line rather than an arm, foot, or other body parts, a double Photocell is commonly used. Times are only recorded by an electronic timing system when both of these Photocells are simultaneously blocked.
Photo finish systems are also used at some track and field events.

World Records

Sprint training 

While genetics play a large role in one's ability to sprint, athletes must be dedicated to their training to ensure that they can optimize their performances. Sprint training includes various running workouts, targeting acceleration, speed development, speed endurance, special endurance, and tempo endurance. Additionally, athletes perform intense strength training workouts, as well as plyometric or jumping workouts. Collectively, these training methods produce qualities that allow athletes to be stronger, and more powerful, in hopes of ultimately running faster.

See also

 Sprint cycling
 Athletics at the Summer Olympics
 60 metres at the Olympics
 100 metres at the Olympics
 200 metres at the Olympics
 400 metres at the Olympics
 Sprint hurdles at the Olympics
 400 metres hurdles at the Olympics
 4×100 metres relay at the Olympics
 4×400 metres relay at the Olympics

Notes and references

External links
 Top 10 greatest sprint races in history
 IAAF list of sprint records in XML

 
Athletics by type
Running by type
Anaerobic exercise